Ruhelkhand Express (15309 / 15310) is a Express train belonging to Indian Railways - North Eastern Railway zone that runs between Bareilly Junction railway station and Aishbagh railway station in India. It has 13 coaches, out of 9 are General coaches, 2 Coaches are for AC and 2 for luggage. This train is currently cancelled due to gauge conversion.

Route and halts
 Bhojipura Junction railway station (BPR)
 Bijauria Junction railway station  (BJV)
 Pilibhit Junction railway station (PBE)
 Puranpur railway station (PP)
 Mailani Junction railway station (MLN)
 Gola Gokarannath railway station (GK)
 Lakhimpur railway station (LMP)
 Hargaon railway station (HA)
 Sitapur City Junction railway station (SPC)
 Sidhauli railway station (SD)
 Ataria railway station (AA)
 Mohibullapur railway station (MBP)
 Daliganj Junction railway station (DAL)
 Lucknow City railway station (LC)

Coach Composition
 11 General Seating Coaches
 2 Seating cum Luggage Rake

References

Express trains in India
Passenger trains originating from Lucknow
North Eastern Railway zone
Named passenger trains of India
Trains from Bareilly